The 1975 FA Cup final was the 94th final of the FA Cup. It took place on 3 May 1975 at Wembley Stadium and was contested by London clubs West Ham United and Fulham. The Fulham team contained two former England captains in former West Ham captain Bobby Moore, making his last appearance at Wembley, and Alan Mullery.

West Ham won 2–0, with both goals scored by Alan Taylor. The first came in the 60th minute when Fulham goalkeeper Peter Mellor parried Billy Jennings' shot into Taylor's path; the second came four minutes later when Taylor capitalised after Mellor failed to hold on to Graham Paddon's shot.

The 1975 West Ham team remains the last all-English team to win the FA Cup. The match remains the only occasion that Fulham have appeared in an FA Cup final; it was the club's last major final for 35 years, until the 2010 UEFA Europa League Final.

Match details

References

External links
Line-ups

FA Cup Finals
Final
FA Cup Final 1975
FA Cup Final 1975
FA Cup Final
FA Cup Final